Brace Farm, also known as Pleasant Hill Stock Farm, is a historic home and farm located at Meetinghouse Green in Herkimer County, New York.  The Brace farmhouse was built in 1861, and consists of a two-story, three bay, main block and 1 1/2-story rear ell with Italianate style design elements.  The frame dwelling has a low-pitched hipped roof topped by a cupola, overhanging bracketed eaves, and a one-story front porch with decorative scrollwork. Also on the property are a contributing carriage house (c. 1870) and massive dairy barn complex (c. 1810 with multiple additions).

It was listed on the National Register of Historic Places in 2013.

References

Farms on the National Register of Historic Places in New York (state)
Houses completed in 1861
Italianate architecture in New York (state)
Houses in Herkimer County, New York
National Register of Historic Places in Herkimer County, New York